A trumpeter is a musician who plays the trumpet.

Trumpeter may also refer to:

Animals
Birds:
Psophia, a small genus of birds restricted to the forests of the Amazon and Guiana Shield in South America
Trumpeter (pigeon), some breeds of domesticated pigeon
Trumpeter swan, a large swan, sometimes informally called a "trumpeter"

Fish:
Trumpeter (fish), a family of marine fish Latridae
Trumpeter whiting (Sillago maculata)
Yellowtail trumpeter (Amniataba caudavittata)
Terapon

Ships
HMS Trumpeter (D09), an escort carrier that served in the Royal Navy during World War II
, an LST(3) in service 1947-56
HMS Trumpeter (P294), a patrol boat in the Royal Navy
USS Trumpeter (DE-180), a World War II–era US Navy destroyer escort
USS Trumpeter (DE-279), alternate name of HMS Kempthorne

Places
Trumpeter, Edmonton, a neighbourhood in northwest Edmonton, Alberta, Canada
Trumpeter Islets, a group of two small islets near the southern end of the western coast of Tasmania, Australia

Other uses
Trumpeter (rank), a regiment specific, descriptive name given to Privates in the British Army
Trumpeter (company), a plastic model kit company based in China
Trumpeter clock, a type of clock that uses air vibrating a reed to mimic the sound of a trumpet
Trumpeter Books, an imprint of Shambhala Publications
The Trumpeter (song), 1904 song
The Trumpeter (journal), Canadian academic journal

See also

List of trumpeters
Trumper, a surname